East Armuchee is an unincorporated community in Walker County, in the U.S. state of Georgia.

History
According to one source, Armuchee is a name derived from the Cherokee language meaning "hominy". Another source asserts it means "land of the flowers".

References

Unincorporated communities in Walker County, Georgia
Unincorporated communities in Georgia (U.S. state)